Errol West (born 16 November 1947) is a Jamaican boxer. He competed in the men's featherweight event at the 1968 Summer Olympics. At the 1968 Summer Olympics, he lost to Edward Tracey of Ireland.

West also represented Jamaica at the 1967 and 1971 Pan American Games.

References

External links
 

1947 births
Living people
Featherweight boxers
Jamaican male boxers
Olympic boxers of Jamaica
Boxers at the 1968 Summer Olympics
Commonwealth Games competitors for Jamaica
Boxers at the 1970 British Commonwealth Games
Pan American Games competitors for Jamaica
Boxers at the 1967 Pan American Games
Boxers at the 1971 Pan American Games
Sportspeople from Kingston, Jamaica
Commonwealth Games medallists in boxing
Commonwealth Games bronze medallists for Jamaica
Boxers at the 1966 British Empire and Commonwealth Games
20th-century Jamaican people
Medallists at the 1966 British Empire and Commonwealth Games